Ward Township is one of the eleven townships of Hocking County, Ohio, United States. As of the 2010 census the population was 1,933, of whom 1,469 lived in the unincorporated portions of the township.

Geography
Located in the far eastern part of the county, it borders the following townships:
Coal Township, Perry County - north
Trimble Township, Athens County - east
Dover Township, Athens County - southeast corner
York Township, Athens County - south
Starr Township - southwest corner
Green Township - west
Falls Township (northeastern portion) - northwest

It is the most easterly township in Hocking County.

Murray City, the smallest municipality in Hocking County, is located in Ward Township, as are the unincorporated communities of Carbon Hill and Sand Run.

Name and history
Ward Township was organized in 1836. It was named for Naham (or perhaps Nathan) Ward, a landowner.

It is the only Ward Township statewide.

Government
The township is governed by a three-member board of trustees, who are elected in November of odd-numbered years to a four-year term beginning on the following January 1. Two are elected in the year after the presidential election and one is elected in the year before it. There is also an elected township fiscal officer, who serves a four-year term beginning on April 1 of the year after the election, which is held in November of the year before the presidential election. Vacancies in the fiscal officership or on the board of trustees are filled by the remaining trustees.

Public services
The residents of Ward Township are served by the Nelsonville-York City School District and Nelsonville-York High School.

References

External links
County website

Townships in Hocking County, Ohio
Townships in Ohio